The Chaste Libertine is a 1952 West German comedy film directed by Carl Boese and starring Georg Thomalla, Joe Stöckel and Grethe Weiser. It was based on a popular stage farce of the same title by Franz Arnold and Ernst Bach which had previously been turned into the 1931 film The Night Without Pause.

It was made at the Spandau Studios of Artur Brauner's CCC Films. The film's sets were designed by Emil Hasler and Walter Kutz.

Synopsis
When his wife suspects Julius Seibold her circus-owning husband of having an affair, he tries to allay her suspicions by suggesting that it is really his young assistant Max who is having a relationship with the woman, and that he is in fact a playboy. This invented lifestyle in turn attracts the Siebold's daughter to Max.

Cast
 Georg Thomalla as Max Stieglitz
 Joe Stöckel as Julius Seibold
 Grethe Weiser as Regine Seibold
 Marianne Koch as Gerty Seibold
 Karl Schönböck as Dr. Fellner
 Dorit Kreysler as Rita Reiner
 Ethel Reschke as Dolly
 Rolf Weih as Riemann
 Ursula Herking as Anna
 Bully Buhlan as Singer
 Wolfgang Jansen

References

Bibliography 
 Hans-Michael Bock and Tim Bergfelder. The Concise Cinegraph: An Encyclopedia of German Cinema. Berghahn Books, 2009.

External links 
 

1952 films
1952 comedy films
German comedy films
West German films
1950s German-language films
Films directed by Carl Boese
German films based on plays
German black-and-white films
Films shot at Spandau Studios
1950s German films